Enjoy Contemporary Art Space is a contemporary art space in Cuba Street arts area of Wellington, New Zealand. 

Commonly known as 'Enjoy', the gallery was founded in 2000 by artists Ciaran Begley, Ros Cameron and Rachel Smithies as an artist-run space. Today, Enjoy operates as a not-for-profit contemporary art space, presenting exhibitions, publications, public programmes and residencies by emerging and mid-career artists. Enjoy is supported by Creative New Zealand and the Wellington City Council.
In addition to staging exhibitions, Enjoy regularly publishes critical writing online as well as printed exhibition catalogues and art related publications.

The gallery has been based at three locations throughout its lifespan. Between 2000 and 2006, the gallery was based at a first floor space at 174 Cuba St. In 2006, the gallery relocated to Level 1, 147 Cuba St. In 2019, the gallery moved again to a ground floor space at 211 Left Bank, off Cuba Mall.

Enjoy is governed by a Board of Trustees, made up of Wellington-based artists and arts professionals. Between 2001 and 2019, the organisation was called Enjoy Public Art Gallery.

Vision and Mission 
Vision

Leading contemporary art practice for Aotearoa.

Mission

To develop experimental work

To nurture, challenge and support practitioners

To nurture, challenge and support audiences

To grow a diverse contemporary art community

Second ten years: 2010–current

First ten years 2000–2009

References

Artist-run centres
2000 establishments in New Zealand
Art museums and galleries in New Zealand
Museums in Wellington City